Old Hotel, also known as Williams Ordinary and Love's Tavern, is a historic inn and tavern located in Dumfries, Virginia.

History 
It is dated to about 1765, and is a two-story, five bay, Georgian style brick building. It features stone quoins and a stone doorway. The building has a fully molded wood cornice with modillions, hipped roof, and four interior end chimneys.

In the fall of 2016, new evidence emerged from dendrochronology testing by the Oxford Tree Ring Laboratory in Baltimore that the building may not be as old as previously thought. The dendrochronology testing, which examines the wood in the building, reveals the structure may date to 1786–87, just before George Washington took office. The building, one of the oldest in Prince William County, is currently used by the county for its Historic Preservation offices.

It was listed on the National Register of Historic Places in 1969.

References

External links
 Williams' Ordinary, Main Street, Dumfries, Prince William County, VA: 2 photos at Historic American Buildings Survey

Historic American Buildings Survey in Virginia
Drinking establishments on the National Register of Historic Places in Virginia
Georgian architecture in Virginia
Buildings and structures in Prince William County, Virginia
National Register of Historic Places in Prince William County, Virginia